The  Greek Catholic Eparchy of Mukachevo is an eparchy (diocese) associated with the Ruthenian Greek Catholic Church under an unidentified status and territory located in the west of Ukraine, roughly equivalent with Zakarpatska Oblast. The eparchy was created by the Pope Clement XIV in 1771.

The eparchy is in full communion with the Catholic Church. Its parishes observe the Byzantine Rite which is also celebrated by the majority of Orthodox Christians, and as provided for in the original terms of the Union of Uzhhorod.

The eparchy is a mother eparchy of at least four modern metropoles, i.e., the Slovak Greek Catholic Church, the Romanian Greek Catholic Church, the Hungarian Greek Catholic Church, and the Byzantine Catholic Metropolitan Church of Pittsburgh in the United States.

History 
Some historians believe that the origins of the eparchy are to be found in the missionary work of Saints Cyril and Methodius in the ninth century. The 14th century saw the founding of the famous Saint Nicholas Monastery on "Chernecha Hora" or "Hill of Monks" located in the city of Mukachevo. Many believe that from that point, the Eparchy of Mukachevo evolved into the entity as we know it today. The bishops resided at the Monastery and administered ecclesiastical affairs from there until 1766. After the union with Rome and until 1946, the Monastery of St Nicholas was also the principal religious house of the monks of the Order of Saint Basil the Great (OSBM), also called Basilian monks.

The bishops, clergy and faithful of this eparchy were originally Orthodox Christians at some point were reconstituted under an eparchy suffragan to the original Metropolitan of Kiev (Rhosia Orthodox Church) that was under the jurisdiction of the Patriarch of Constantinople (see Eparchy of Mukačevo and Prešov).

In 1646, following the example of their compatriots across the Carpathian Mountains in Galicia (current day Western Ukraine), who in 1596 established the Union of Brest, the people of the Mukachevo eparchy united with the papal Holy See (recognizing the primacy of Catholic Rome, not Byzantine, Orthodox 'second Rome' Constantinople) under what is known as the Union of Uzhhorod. Other Eastern Orthodox Christians who belonged to the original Eastern Orthodox eparchy of Mukachevo and refused to convert joined the eparchy of Buda that is suffragan to the Serbian Patriarchate of Peć (and later Patriarchate of Karlovci).

In the political and spiritual climate of the day, union with Rome was considered by many to be a productive solution to promoting both the welfare of the people and the church. Following a model similar to that proposed at the Council of Florence, the people were allowed to maintain their Byzantine Rite spiritual, liturgical and canonical traditions, while recognizing the Roman Pontiff as the head of the universal church. From 1646 to 1771 the eparchy was suffragan to the Roman Catholic Archdiocese of Eger.

On September 19, 1771, after decades of efforts on the part of the bishops of Mukachevo for recognition as a fully self-governing ecclesiastical entity, free from the control of the Latin Catholic bishops of Eger (today in Hungary), the Habsburg Holy Roman Empress Maria Theresa issued a decree, subsequently approved by Rome, that created a jurisdictionally independent Mukachevo Eparchy no longer subordinate to the Latin Rite ordinary. It was also at this time that the faithful of the eparchy formally became known as Greek Catholics. During the episcopate of Bishop Andrii Bachynskyij (1772-1809), the eparchy retained its historic name but its seat was moved to Uzhhorod (1780), where it remains to this day. The Cathedral of the Exaltation of the Holy Cross in Uzhhorod is the seat of the eparchy.

Following the Second World War and the occupation of Carpatho-Ukraine by the Soviet regime, the Greek Catholic Church was liquidated in 1949. All properties were allocated to the Russian Orthodox Church and the clergy and many faithful exiled to concentration camps. The bishop of Mukachevo during this time was Theodore Romzha. In 1947, Bishop Romzha was poisoned by NKVD (predecessor of the KGB) authorities. During the Soviet years, the Greek Catholic Church in Galicia, Transcarpathia and Slovakia continued to operate secretly in the underground.

With the collapse of the Soviet Union, many priests and faithful of the Eparchy of Mukachevo came out of the catacombs. The eparchy was allowed to officially renew its activities in 1989. Bishop Ivan Semedi, who had been secretly consecrated during the persecution years, was the first bishop to freely perform his ministry in over 40 years.

Bishops 

The list of the eparchs (bishops) of the Greek Catholic Eparchy of Mukachevo is:

Eastern Orthodox bishops

Hierotheos, 940
Joannes I, 1491-1498
Basilius I, 1551-1552
Hilarius I, 1556-1559
Euthymius I, 1561-1567
Amphilochius, 1569-1596
Basilius II, 1597-inc.
Sergius, 1601-1616
Sophronius I, 1616
Hilarius II
Euthymius II, 1618-inc.
Petronius, 1623-1627
Joannes II (Hrehorovych), 1627-1633
Basilius III (Tarasovych), 1634-1642
Porphyry (Arden), 1640—1643
Sophronius II (Yusko), 1646 (Vlach)
Basilius III (Tarasovych), 1646-1648
Parfeniy (Petrovych-Ratoszynski), 1648—1649
Joannicius (Zeikan), 1652—1686
Theophanes (Mavrokordato), 1677 (Archbishop of Hungarian Ruthenia)
Methodius (Rakovecki), 1687—1692
Joseph (Stojka), 1692—1711
Dosyteus (Feodorovych), 1711—1734

Greek Catholic bishops
after the 1646 Union of Uzhhorod the Eparchy of Mukachevo united with Rome
Vasyl Tarasovych, 1646-1648
Petro Parfenii, 1649-1665
Yosyf Voloshynovskyi, 1670-1673
Porphyriy Kulchynskyi, 1681-1686
Yosyf de Kamelis (Joseph de Camillis), 1690-1706
Yosyf Hodermarskyi, 1706-1716
Hennadiy Bizantsiy, 1716-1733
Stefan Olshavskyi, 1733-1737
Havryil Blazhovskyi, 1738–1742
Manuil Olshavskyi, 1743–1767
Ivan Bradach, 1767–1771
In 1771 the Eparchy of Mukachevo got his independence from the Latin bishop of Eger
Ivan Bradach, 1771–1772
Andriy Bachynskyi, 1773–1809
 auxiliary bishop Mykhaylo Bradach, 1808–1812
Mykhaylo Bradach, Apostolic Administrator, 1812–1815
Oleksiy Povchiy, 1816–1831
Vasyl Popovych, 1837–1864
Stefan Pankovych, 1866–1874
Ivan Pasteliy, 1876–1891
Yuliy Firtsak, 1891–1912
 coadjutor bishop Antal Papp, 1912
Antal Papp, 1912–1924
Petro Gebey, 1924–1931
Oleksandr Stoyka, 1932–1943
Miklós Dudás, Apostolic Administrator, 1943–1946
Bl. Teodor Romzha, 1944–1947
In 1949 the Communist Ukrainian Soviet Socialist Republic abolished the Greek Catholic Church; all its properties were allocated to the Russian Orthodox Church.
 Clandestine Bishops
Alexander Chira, 1944–1983
Petro Oros, 1944–1953
Konstantyn Sabov, 1977–1982
Ivan Semedi, 1978–1991
Yosyf Holovach, 1983–1991
Ivan Margitych, 1987–1991
In 16 January 1991 the Holy See confirmed all clandestine consecrations
Ivan Semedi, 1991-2002
 auxiliary bishop Yosyf Holovach, 1991–2000
 auxiliary bishop Ivan Margitych, 1991–2002
 auxiliary bishop Đura Džudžar, 2001–2003
Milan Šašik, Apostolic Administrator, 2002–2010
Milan Šašik, 2010–2020
 auxiliary bishop Nil Lushchak, 2012–2020
Nil Lushchak, Apostolic Administrator, since 2020

Statistics 
In 2014 the eparchy had 320,000 faithful, 2 bishops, 429 parishes,  280 diocesan priests, 30 religious priests, 44 men religious, 45 women religious, 0 deacons and 98 seminarians.

See also 
 Eparchy of Mukačevo and Prešov

Sources and external links 
 Official site 
 GigaCatholic
 The Hierarchy of the Catholic Church

References

Further reading 
 
 

Mukachevo
Zakarpattia Oblast
Eastern Catholic dioceses in Ukraine
History of Carpathian Ruthenia
Eastern Catholicism in Ukraine
Mukachevo